Anthony Campbell may refer to:

Anthony Campbell (boxer) (born 1990), American boxer
Anthony Campbell (cricketer) (born 1950), Jamaican cricketer
Anthony Campbell (judge) (born 1936), retired Lord Justice of Appeal in Northern Ireland
Anthony Campbell (physician), retired consultant physician at The Royal London Homeopathic Hospital 
Anthony Alexander Campbell, British rapper and producer better known as Dobie
Anthony C. Campbell (1853–1932), American attorney and politician

See also
Antony F. Campbell (1934–2020), biblical scholar
Tony Campbell (disambiguation)